Robert Scott Detlof (born 6 May 1961) is a Brazilian alpine skier. He competed in the men's slalom at the 1992 Winter Olympics.

References

External links
 

1961 births
Living people
Brazilian male alpine skiers
Olympic alpine skiers of Brazil
Alpine skiers at the 1992 Winter Olympics
Place of birth missing (living people)